The 2016 Jalisco Open was a professional tennis tournament played on hard courts. It was the sixth edition of the tournament which was part of the 2016 ATP Challenger Tour. It took place in Guadalajara, Mexico between 14 and 20 March 2016.

Singles main-draw entrants

Seeds

 1 Rankings as of March 7, 2016.

Other entrants
The following players received wildcards into the singles main draw:
  Manuel Sánchez
  Lucas Gómez
  Hans Hach Verdugo
  Tigre Hank

The following players received entry into the singles main draw as special exempt:
  Peđa Krstin
  Eduardo Struvay

The following players entered the singles main draw as alternates:
  Oriol Roca Batalla
  Jordi Samper-Montaña

The following players received entry from the qualifying draw:
  Ernesto Escobedo
  Marcelo Arévalo
  Marinko Matosevic
  Daniel Elahi Galán

Champions

Singles

  Malek Jaziri def.  Stéphane Robert, 5–7, 6–3, 7–6(7–5)

Doubles

  Gero Kretschmer /  Alexander Satschko def.  Santiago González /  Mate Pavić, 6–3, 4–6, [10–2]

External links
Official Website 

Jalisco Open
Jalisco Open
2016 in Mexican tennis